HMS Resistance was the second of two s built for the Royal Navy in the 1860s. She was the first capital ship in the Royal Navy to be fitted with a ram and was given the nickname of Old Rammo. Resistance was initially assigned to the Channel Fleet upon commissioning, but was transferred to the Mediterranean Fleet in 1864, the first ironclad to be assigned to that fleet. She was rearmed in 1867 and became a guardship when recommissioned in 1869. The ship was reassigned to the Channel Fleet in 1873 before reverting to her former duties in 1877. Resistance was decommissioned in 1880 and was used for gunnery and torpedo trials beginning in 1885. The ship was sold for scrap in 1898 and foundered in 1899 en route to the breaker's yard. She was salvaged and later scrapped.

Design and description
The Defence-class ironclads were designed as smaller and cheaper versions of the  armoured frigates. This meant that they could not fit the same powerful engines of the Warrior-class ships and were therefore  slower and had far fewer guns. The naval architect Sir Nathaniel Barnaby, a future Constructor of the Navy, considered that, in terms of combat, a Defence-class ship was worth one quarter of a Warrior.

The ship displaced  and had a ram in the shape of a plough, the first capital ship in the Royal Navy to be fitted with one. The hull was subdivided by watertight transverse bulkheads into 92 compartments and had a double bottom underneath the engine and boiler rooms. Resistance was  shorter overall and displaced over  less than the Warrior-class ironclads.

Propulsion
The Defence-class ships had a single two-cylinder trunk steam engine made by John Penn and Sons driving a single  propeller.

The lower masts and bowsprit were made of iron to withstand the shock of ramming. Resistance could make about  under sail and the funnel was semi-retractable to reduce wind resistance while under sail alone. The ship's propeller could be hoisted up into the stern of the ship to reduce drag while under sail. She was re-rigged as a barque from September 1864 to April 1866 before returning to her original ship rig.

Armament
The armament of the Defence-class ships was intended to be 18 smoothbore, muzzle-loading 68-pounder guns, eight on each side on the main deck and one each fore and aft as chase guns on the upper deck, plus four rifled breech-loading 40-pounder guns as saluting guns. This was modified during construction to six rifled 110-pounder breech-loading guns, ten 68-pounders and two 32-pounder smoothbore guns, the only such weapons ever mounted in a British ironclad. Both breech-loading guns were new designs from Armstrong and much was hoped of them. Four of the 110-pounder guns were installed on the main deck amidships and the other two became chase guns; all of the 68-pounder guns were mounted on the main deck. Firing tests carried out in September 1861 against an armoured target, however, proved that the 110-pounder was inferior to the 68-pounder smoothbore gun in armour penetration and repeated incidents of breech explosions during the Battles for Shimonoseki and the Bombardment of Kagoshima in 1863–1864 caused the navy to begin to withdraw the gun from service shortly afterwards.

All of the guns could fire both solid shot and explosive shells.

Resistance was rearmed during her 1867–1868 refit with fourteen 7-inch and two  rifled muzzle-loading guns. The new guns were heavier so fewer could be carried. It was credited with the nominal ability to penetrate  armour.

Armour

The ends of the ship were left entirely unprotected which meant that the steering gear was very vulnerable. They were, however, sub-divided into many watertight compartments to minimize any flooding.

Construction and service
Resistance was ordered on 14 December 1859 and laid down a week later by Westwood, Baillie at their shipyard in Cubitt Town, London. She was launched on 11 April 1861, commissioned in July 1862 and completed on 5 October at the cost of £258,120. After completion she served in the Channel Fleet until 1864 when she was transferred to the Mediterranean Fleet, the first British ironclad assigned to that fleet. In 1867 the ship was paid off in Portsmouth for refit and re-armament. Resistance recommissioned in 1869 as guardship in the River Mersey and served there until 1873 when she returned to the Channel Fleet. In 1877 the ship resumed her post as Mersey guardship until she was paid off in 1880 at Devonport.

In 1885 Resistance began to be used as a target for the testing of armour against the effects of torpedoes and gunfire. On 3 February 1888, she sank in Portchester Creek following the test of a Whitehead torpedo.

Disposal
Resistance was sold for scrap to J S Turnbull of Glasgow on 11 November 1898. On 4 February 1899 she departed Spithead in tow of the Liverpool tugs Pathfinder and Wrestler for the Mersey, to be broken up. In a gale in the Irish Sea on 8 February, her steam steering engine failed due to a boiler problem, she shipped water in the forward compartments and the stokehold. In view of the leaks and the inability to steer, the tugs sought a port of refuge and brought her to anchor inside Holyhead Breakwater, in the outer harbour. To prevent a total loss and a potential danger to navigation, she was towed further into the harbour and put ashore in Penrhos Bay.  

After salvage operations, Resistance was refloated on 17 February and the tow to the Mersey completed. On 13 March she was beached at Oglet Point, near Garston, where she was broken up by the ironfounders Monks, Hall & Co, of Warrington.

Notes

Footnotes

References
 
 
 
 
 
 

 

Defence-class ironclads
Ships built in Poplar
1861 ships
Victorian-era battleships of the United Kingdom
Maritime incidents in February 1888
Shipwrecks of Wales
Maritime incidents in 1899